Ismail Wajeeh (20 September 1962) is a Maldivian actor and choreographer.

Early life
While studying in primary school, Wajeeh, along with his nephews used to perform songs and stage shows to small gatherings. While studying in grade 4, he was offered to be part of an English radio drama produced by the Voice of Maldives, titled "The Enormous Turnip". During his secondary education, he played small roles in stage dramas as an extra. In 1982, he got offered by the leading theatre performing group, Cultural and Drama Society (CDS) to be part of their group.

Career
In 1984, while Wajeeh was working in Television Maldives, he meets the director Mohamed Hilmy, a friend of his brother, who asked Wajeeh if he is interested to be the lead actor of his upcoming film, Chuttee (1984), to which he agrees instantly. In the film, he played a shady character which was well received by the critics and audience.

The Mohamed Hilmy and Ali Waheed directed film, Ihsaas was released in 1993 in which Wajeeh starred as an orphan who is psychologically disturbed following a false arrest. His "genuine" performance received positive reviews from critics and resulted in winning a Gaumee Film Award for Best Actor. The next year, he starred in Ali Waheed-directed Kulunu where he played the role of a doctor who is forced to marry his childhood friend. Mariyam Shauqee's widely acclaimed family drama television series Kahthiri was released in 1997; here Wajeeh played the role of a stay home husband, living in a congested housing complex while dealing with various social issues.

In 2000, he appeared in two films; Hussain Shihab's drama film Rihun and Mohamed Ali Manik's Maazee alongside Jamsheedha Ahmed, Mariyam Nazima and Aminath Rasheedha which narrates the story of two best friends, a boy and a girl, who get separated at childhood and reunite as adults. Ahmed played the role of underprivileged young man who turns into a successful person due to his hardwork and determination.

The following year he starred as a widower in the Abdulla Sujau and Abdul Faththaah-directed family drama Ranmuiy (2001) which is centered on the dispute between a daughter and her step-mother. The film was heavily marketed for its item song featuring himself and Indian actress Rajeshwari, which also marks the first international collaboration in the local industry. Afterwards, he relocated to Singapore and disappeared in all local productions.

Sixteen years later, Wajeeh made a comeback in a special appearance with the Dark Rain Entertainment's production, the romantic comedy Mee Loaybakee (2017) followed by another of their comedy films Maamui (2019).

Personal life
Apart from acting, Wajeeh served as the Assistant Principal in Jamaluddin School. Afterwards, he started working as a program coordinator at Television Maldives. He married a Singapore-Indian woman residing in Singapore and relocated to Singapore in 2001, hoping to provide better education for their children.

Filmography

Feature film

Television

Accolades

References 

Living people
People from Malé
21st-century Maldivian actors
Maldivian film actors
1962 births